The 1929 Washington Huskies football team was an American football team that represented the University of Washington during the 1929 college football season. In its ninth season under head coach Enoch Bagshaw, the team compiled a 2–6–1 record, finished in last place in the Pacific Coast Conference, but still outscored all opponents by a combined total of 145 to 127. Paul Jessup was the team captain.

Schedule

References

Washington
Washington Huskies football seasons
Washington Huskies football